The John Lennon Collection is a 1982 posthumous compilation album of music from John Lennon's solo career.

Release and selection
The album was originally scheduled for release in late 1981, but was held back a year due to legalities owing to the fact that half the songs on the album were licensed to EMI and the other half, songs from Double Fantasy, were licensed to Geffen. It was eventually released on 1 November 1982 by Parlophone in the United Kingdom, and on 8 November by Geffen in the United States. It was the first Lennon album to be issued following his death in 1980. The album includes most of Lennon's hit singles and other tracks from his solo albums recorded with EMI from 1970 to 1975, as well as all but one of his compositions (track 3 - "Cleanup Time") from his final album Double Fantasy, which was initially distributed by Geffen Records in America and EMI/Parlophone in the United Kingdom.

The EMI selections on the album are similar to those on Shaved Fish, Lennon's 1975 compilation album, but without the singles "Cold Turkey", "Mother" and "Woman Is the Nigger of the World."  The 1975 hit single "Stand by Me" and "Love", a popular track from the John Lennon/Plastic Ono Band album, were added. The other half consisted of many of the tracks from Double Fantasy. In the US, the album was issued with a slightly different track listing, with "Happy Xmas (War Is Over)" and "Stand by Me" excluded.

Reissue
In 1989, after EMI acquired the rights to the Double Fantasy material, The John Lennon Collection was remastered and reissued worldwide with two bonus tracks for its CD release, "Move Over Ms. L" and "Cold Turkey" (the former being the only officially released Lennon track previously unavailable on any UK album, the latter the only UK hit single originally excluded from the compilation). "Move Over Ms. L" was the more notable inclusion: originally intended for Walls and Bridges but cut at the last minute, it was released as the B-side to "Stand by Me". The CD was released in the UK on 23 October 1989. "Less Christmassy than it sounds, ['Cold Turkey'] is now restored on CD," wrote Mat Snow in Q, "and is guaranteed to poop any party of sentimental Lennonism – presumably why it's kept till last; 1970's Plastic Ono Band album apart, it remains his most discomfortingly intense work."

In the US, the 1989 CD re-issue of The John Lennon Collection not only included the two bonus tracks but also the two songs originally excluded from the US release, "Happy Xmas (War Is Over)" and "Stand by Me" (these were also thought of as 'bonus tracks' in the US), thereby making the track-listing now identical in both countries.

Reception

As Lennon's first posthumous release, The John Lennon Collection did extremely well, reaching number 1 in the UK and peaking at number 33 in the US where it would eventually reach triple platinum. The album sold 300,000 copies in the first week, and 1 million by its third week in the UK. In the UK, "Love" was excerpted as a single, (featuring a version of the song without the slow fade-ins) and managed to reach number 41. "Beautiful Boy (Darling Boy)" was released as the B-side to "Happy Xmas (War Is Over)", which was released by Geffen, in a brand-new picture sleeve, in the US.

Cover
The front and back cover photographs for The John Lennon Collection were taken by famed photographer Annie Leibovitz on 8 December 1980; Lennon was murdered later that evening by Mark David Chapman at Lennon's residence The Dakota.

Track listing
All songs by John Lennon, except where noted.

Side one
"Give Peace a Chance" – 4:52
 Originally credited to Lennon–McCartney, the credit was revised in the 1990s to cite only Lennon as its composer.
"Instant Karma!" – 3:20
"Power to the People" – 3:16
"Whatever Gets You thru the Night" – 3:17
 Features Elton John on harmony vocal and piano.
"#9 Dream" – 4:46
"Mind Games" – 4:12
"Love" – 3:22
 Released as a single unique to this collection. Originally released in 1970 on John Lennon/Plastic Ono Band.
"Happy Xmas (War Is Over)" (Lennon/Yoko Ono) – 3:33
 Originally excluded from the US vinyl version of this compilation, included on cassette and 1989 re-issue.

Side two
"Imagine" (Lennon/Ono) – 3:02
 Originally credited to Lennon, the credit was revised in the 2010s to cite Ono as co-composer.
"Jealous Guy" – 4:14
"Stand by Me" (Jerry Leiber/Mike Stoller/Ben E. King) – 3:25
 Originally excluded from the US vinyl version of this compilation, included on cassette and 1989 re-issue.
"(Just Like) Starting Over" – 3:55
"Woman" – 3:25
"I'm Losing You" – 3:57
"Beautiful Boy (Darling Boy)" – 4:01
"Watching the Wheels" – 3:31
"Dear Yoko" – 2:33

1989 CD bonus tracks
"Move Over Ms. L" – 2:56
 Originally released in 1975 as "Stand by Me"'s B-Side
"Cold Turkey" – 5:01

Charts

Weekly charts

Year-end charts

Certifications and sales

Credits
Mastering – Greg Fulginiti US
John Kalodner : John Kalodner

References
 Footnotes

 Citations

Albums produced by Jack Douglas (record producer)
Compilation albums published posthumously
John Lennon compilation albums
1982 greatest hits albums
Parlophone compilation albums
Albums produced by Phil Spector
Albums produced by John Lennon
Albums produced by Yoko Ono